Reversal is a video game published by Hayden Software for the Apple II in 1981. Atari 8-bit family and Commodore 64 versions followed in 1983. Reversal is a computerized version of the board game Othello.

Reception
Bob Boyd reviewed the game for Computer Gaming World, and stated that "Othello is a classic strategy game. This is an accurate adaptation for the computer with various features to enhance the game. Reversal plays quickly and easily, the graphics are good, and the computer can be hard to beat. It is excellent and I recommend it."

References

External links
in Interface Age
Review in Byte
1984 Software Encyclopedia from Electronic Games
Review in The Addison Wesley Book Of Atari Software 1984
Review in Peelings II

1981 video games
Apple II games
Atari 8-bit family games
Commodore 64 games
Video games based on board games
Video games developed in the United States